Return of Wolverine is a 2018 comic book miniseries published by Marvel Comics. This miniseries is a continuation on the events that transpired in the "Death of Wolverine" and "Hunt for Wolverine" storylines, and explains how Wolverine returned from the dead.

Premise
As a follow-up to the "Hunt for Wolverine" storyline, Marvel released this five-part mini-series to precede a new "Wolverine" comic series.

Plot
Our story begins with Wolverine in agony, kneeling in a pool of blood as his claws glow red hot. He is surrounded by dead soldiers as well as a living caged smilodon in the background. He gives water to Bernard Delacroix, a wounded scientist for Soteira brought into their service to work on their de-extinction project. He is shocked to see Wolverine alive and begs to be released from the will of Soteira by having Wolverine kill him with his claws. Suddenly, a grenade rolls into the laboratory killing Bernard and freeing the Smilodon who attacks Wolverine, triggering a brief memory of Kitty Pryde. The smilodon is then gored by a woolly mammoth that was also released in the explosion as Wolverine sees a variety of past memories of himself advising him to go after Soteira before they harm everyone else. Hearing machine gun fire that has killed the woolly mammoth at the cost of its attackers at the outside entrance, Wolverine rides a motorcycle down to a work camp on the shore that is soon engulfed in flames as evacuations orders are announced over the PA system. He witnesses a sniper shooting a fleeing scientist. Upon returning fire on the sniper, the masked soldier is revealed to be White Sky's Omega Red clone who shoots out the front tire of Wolverine's motorcycle. Thrown from the wreck and hitting his head on a rock, he eventually loses consciousness and dreams about Soteira's leader Persephone who guides him through a prison block of incarcerated past memories of himself, enemies, and comrades. She denies his allegations of being evil and claims to have brought him back to life as she kisses him. Wolverine is wakened by a worker from the camp's canteen named Ana who recognizes him as a famous superhero and pleads for his help to rescue her son Perren who has been ordered into custody by one of the soldiers. While realizing that his healing factor has reactivated, there is one wound on his right side that hasn't healed. Ana states that the location he's in is Soteira's research facility where they have collected scientists from all over to help with their work. As Ana staples his wound, Wolverine voices a theory that Ana's son might be used as an incubator of sorts, as she tells him that he was injected with something from their labs before it was destroyed. As Wolverine still has fragmented memories even unable to recognize his own name, Ana recalls a story she heard about him where a man in machine gun armor attacked a hospital as Wolverine selflessly fought to stop him, without regard to his own safety. As Wolverine remembers his name upon unlocking this memory, he hears Ana's claim that Persephone is "the devil" and Soteira's architect. Now suited in one of Soteira's black uniforms, Wolverine decides that it's time to meet Persephone.

Somewhere on the ocean, Wolverine and Ana are on a speedboat pursuing a boat filled with Soteira operatives. He asks Ana what she means about Persephone having a city to which she says that they are testing something there. Wolverine states that Perren may be confined below, as they don't see him on the deck of the boat. Omega Red and another operative are ordered overboard and jump into the water to ambush them. Ana comments that a famous singer once came to the Soteira facility where Wolverine met her while other scientists remained with their equipment. Most of the scientists left in big trucks while the support staff remained to wait for the Killteam. As their speedboat is boarded by Omega Red and the other operative, Ana fires a harpoon gun through Omega Red's head, hurling him off the boat. Wolverine takes on an opponent who has the same claws as Daken until the fight causes rips in his outfit enough to expose his tattoos. As they fight, Wolverine has a vision of a tattooed Daken in a cell and sees a scarred Wolverine ordering to be let out, smashing his head against the bars of his cell door. As his ranting "out" becomes more intense, Wolverine's claws begin to glow red hot and he uses them to ignite the fuel from the outboard motor's fuel line and immolate Daken, throwing him off the boat. Wolverine in his rage nearly slashes Ana, who pleads for him to stop. He has a vision of holding the key to the scarred Wolverine's cell, but regains his composure and refuses to unlock the door. Grinning sadistically, the scarred Wolverine assures him "Soon bub, soon." Exhausted, Wolverine apologizes to Ana and she tells him that the stories she's heard of him did not mention red hot claws. Wolverine tells her that when his claws got hot, he loses control to them and they seem to consume all of his stamina. With an engine lost in the fight, Soteira's boat has sped out of range, but Wolverine still has their scent. Ana thanks Logan for his selflessness with a kiss before they soon arrive at Soteira's island-city. Meanwhile at the Xavier Institute for Mutant Education and Outreach, Jean Grey is using Cerebro and she tells Kitty Pride that she just found Logan.

At the X-Mansion, Kitty informs Storm that Jean Grey used Cerebro to find Wolverine. Kitty Pryde suggests that they take extreme caution over recent events that had Soteira using Wolverine for as they should take the X-Men members that he knows well. Meanwhile at Soteira's island-city, Wolverine recalls Ana's statement that Soteira is running an experiment here. Kitty Pryde, Storm, Jean Grey, Iceman, and Nightcrawler arrive to look for Wolverine when they are attacked by the local police officers and some civilians. Jean states that she can't get anything from the people as she claims that they are hollow. Wolverine picks up the scent of the conflict. Elsewhere on the island-city, a Soteira operative called Zagreus informs Persephone of the fight in the park and asks if they should take action. Persephone states that this could be good for them to observe as she recalls how Wolverine's claws were glowing when he defeated Daken on the boat. As Zagreus states that the X-Men violated Persephone's warnings, he asks how many X-Gene carriers should be killed at the hands of a killteam. She states that Kitty Pryde will be distracted worrying about the pre-mutants as Soteira will focus on their larger plan. In the meantime, she is looking forward to a fight between Wolverine vs. the X-Men. Wolverine finds an injured civilian who claims that the X-Men must be associated with Soteira. Wolverine has a vision of his X-Force persona telling him that he can help out due to his knowledge of their powers and weaknesses. Wolverine then recalls that under duress, Nightcrawler resorts to predictable patterns. Anticipating his next reappearance, Wolverine retracts his claws and punches Nightcrawler in the face. Attempting to attack Jean, he is suddenly encased in ice by Iceman who pleads with Logan to calm down and listen to reason. Facing defeat, Wolverine's Patch alias tells him in a vision that the scarred Wolverine is his berserker mode and warns him that he is unpredictable and dangerously unrestrained. As Wolverine does not want to die again, he unlocks the cell to his berserker mode. Once free, the scarred Wolverine then promptly stabs Logan in the gut. His red hot claws are used to break free of Iceman, cutting him in half at the waist.

Following his battle with the X-Men, Wolverine wakes up strapped in a hospital bed to learn from Ana that Kitty called a retreat due to Iceman's injuries and Soteira's threat to release the berserker Wolverine upon the city's population. She releases his bonds and tells him that during the intense fighting, his claws were glowing white hot and that even after the X-Men, who are in fact his friends, fled from the battle, he still slaughtered about a third of the city's populace until he collapsed from exhaustion. Zagreus enters from the shadows and fires a restraining device through Wolverine's chest that pins him to the wall while Persephone explains her entire world view, her disappointment with human society, and reveals that Ana and Perron are in fact mind-controlled undead entities under her will as is everyone in the island-city, which she is using as a testbed for her ultimate goal. She states that she is a mutant with the ability to resurrect the dead while imbuing them with her own personality and can create mindless zombies as well as drones that are fully articulate enough to even fool the senses of Wolverine, depending upon her level of concentration. Ana collapses when Persephone releases her control and has Zagreus escort Wolverine to a launch pad where she invites him to her lair so that he may decide for himself to kill her or allow her to carry out her plans for world domination.

Arriving at Persephone's space station, Wolverine is met by her holographic projection. She gives him a guided tour of the facility, once again inviting him to join her in her plans to replace all dead end jobs with zombies. In a flashback, she is shown raising Wolverine out of his grave and taking control of his psyche. She claims however that at some point, his reactivated healing-factor nullified her mind control, thus setting the events seen in the de-extinction labs in motion. He refuses to participate in her schemes and she responds by flooding the room with gas, causing his skin to blister painfully. He uses his claws to break the glass observation window, ejecting him into the vacuum of space. He climbs the outer hull and reenters by cutting open an airlock. Back inside, he introduces himself to staff member Phil, who explains Persephone's entire plan to use orbiting satellites to attack the earth with her zombie rays. Wolverine then runs amok throughout the station, cutting down all of Persephone's guards that stand in his way. He has visions of several memories of himself, each offering tactical advice for the fight at hand, including the berserker who orders him to release him from his cell lest he die in his losing battle with Zagreus. Bloodied and nearly defeated, Wolverine reaches up to unlock all of the cell doors at once, leaving only the berserker still incarcerated. With the bulk of his memories returned to him, he then easily slays Zagreus. Reaching the power core of the station, Persephone pleads with Wolverine to cease his destruction, threatening to haunt him forever. Unimpressed with the notion of yet one more ghost in his life, Wolverine uses his claws to destroy the nuclear reactor with Persephone being apparently killed in the process. He then rides the burning remains of the space station as it enters the earth's atmosphere, crashing in the pacific ocean. He emerges from the water horribly burned and is rescued by a fishing trawler. Sometime later in New York City, Wolverine arrives at the X-Mansion to resume his role with the X-Men.

Reception

References

Marvel Comics storylines
2018 in comics